A null cipher, also known as concealment cipher, is an ancient form of encryption where the plaintext is mixed with a large amount of non-cipher material. Today it is regarded as a simple form of steganography, which can be used to hide ciphertext.

This is one of 3 categories of cipher used in classical cryptography along with Substitution ciphers and Transposition ciphers.

Classical cryptography 
In classical cryptography, a null is intended to confuse the cryptanalyst. In the most common form of a null cipher, the plaintext is included within the ciphertext and one needs to discard certain characters in order to decrypt the message (such as first letter, last letter, third letter of every second word, etc.) Most characters in such a cryptogram are nulls, only some are significant, and some others can be used as pointers to the significant ones.

Here is an example null cipher message, sent by a German during World War I:

Taking the first letter of every word reveals the hidden message "Pershing sails from N.Y. June I".

Here is a more complicated example from England's Civil War which aided Royalist Sir John Trevanian in his escape from a Puritan castle in Colchester:WORTHIE SIR JOHN,

HOPE, THAT IS YE BESTE COMFORT OF YE AFFLICTED, CANNOT MUCH, I FEAR ME, HELP YOU NOW. THAT I WOULD SAY TO YOU, IS THIS ONLY: IF EVER I MAY BE ABLE TO REQUITE THAT I DO OWE YOU, STAND NOT UPON ASKING ME. TIS NOT MUCH THAT I CAN DO; BUT WHAT I CAN DO, BEE YE VERY SURE I WILL. I KNOW THAT, IF DETHE COMES, IF ORDINARY MEN FEAR IT, IT FRIGHTS NOT YOU, ACCOUNTING IT FOR A HIGH HONOUR, TO HAVE SUCH A REWARDE OF YOUR LOYALTY. PRAY YET YOU MAY BE SPARED THIS SOE BITTER, CUP. I FEAR NOT THAT YOU WILL GRUDGE ANY SUFFERINGS; ONLY IF BIE SUBMISSIONS YOU CAN TURN THEM AWAY, TIS THE PART OF A WISE MAN. TELL ME, AN IF YOU CAN, TO DO FOR YOU ANYTHINGE THAT YOU WOLDE HAVE DONE. THE GENERAL GOES BACK ON WEDNESDAY. RESTINGE YOUR SERVANT TO COMMAND.The third letter after each punctuation reveals "Panel at East side of Chapel slides".

A similar technique is to hide entire words, such as in this seemingly innocent message  written by a prison inmate but deciphered by the FBI:

Taking only every fifth word, one can reconstruct the hidden text which recommends a "hit" on someone:

Historically, users of concealment ciphers often used substitution and transposition ciphers on the data prior to concealment. For example, Cardinal Richelieu is said to have used a grille to write secret messages, after which the blank spaces were filled out with extraneous matter to create the impression of a continuous text.

Dot concealment cipher 
A dot or pinprick concealment cipher is a common classical encryption method in which dot or pinprick is placed above or below certain letters in a piece of writing. An early reference to this was when Aeneas Tacticus wrote about it in his book On the Defense of Fortifications. The Germans upgraded this to a dot of invisible ink during World War I and World War II.

In England pinpricks in newspapers were once a popular way to send letters with little or no cost.

If you place dots far apart, it could be used well. Make sure to keep the dots small and to use something that makes sense - no advanced computer coding books between package deliverers unless both have clearly indicated that they do it or are very interested in it. You also both need to know which page, chapter, article, or section is used, and if you plan to use this as a system you should find several places. Another option is to have an indicator, such as the date in a newspaper, which shows which page the message is on. This version is less secure.

Acrostics 
(Main Page: Acrostic)

The acrostic puzzle is an extended form of null cipher, but not an Anacrostic (in which you use a set of lettered clues with numbered blanks representing the letters of the answer to figure out the second part, a long series of numbered blanks and spaces representing a message into which the answers for the clues fit). Acrostics in poems and other written works that are not referenced to are a type of Null cipher.

This method is often used to secretly insult a famous or important individual. For example, Rolfe Humphries received a lifelong ban from contributing to Poetry Magazine after he wrote and tried to publish "a poem containing a concealed scurrilous phrase aimed at a well-known person", namely Nicholas Murray Butler.

Definition of a null 
Put simply, a null cipher is any cipher which involves a number of nulls, or decoy letters. As well as the methods shown above, a null cipher could be plaintext words with nulls placed in designated areas or even a plaintext message broken up in different positions with a null at the end of each word. However, a message with only a couple nulls (for example, one at the beginning and one at the end) is not a null cipher.

A null cipher is technically only a term for hidden letters or words within an otherwise unimportant message, however, it is occasionally used for the entire category of concealment ciphers.

Usage 
In general, it is difficult and time-consuming to produce covert texts that seem natural and would not raise suspicion, but if you are unable to use an advanced encryption method and have plenty of time, it might be a good option. If no key or actual encryption is involved, the security of the message relies entirely on the secrecy of the concealment method. Null ciphers in modern times are used by prison inmates in an attempt to have their messages pass inspection.

Null ciphers are one of three major cipher types in classical cryptography, but it is less well known as the others. It is often marked as a subcategory of transposition ciphers, but that is not true, as transposition ciphers are scrambled messages.

See also
 Transposition cipher
 Substitution ciphers
 Acrostic
 Nulls
 Cipher
 Code
 Classical Cryptography
 Cryptanalysis
 Steganography

References

Classical ciphers
Steganography
Cardinal Richelieu